Daniel O'Donoghue (1833 – 7 October 1889) was an Irish politician. He served in the British Parliament from 1857 to 1865 as Member of Parliament (MP) for Tipperary, and from 1865 to 1885 as MP for Tralee.

There is a tomb inside Muckross Abbey near Killarney in County Kerry which bears the inscription "O'Donoghue of the Glens": this may be Daniel O'Donoghue's final resting place.

References

Notes

External links 
 

1833 births
1889 deaths
Members of the Parliament of the United Kingdom for County Tipperary constituencies (1801–1922)
UK MPs 1857–1859
UK MPs 1859–1865
UK MPs 1865–1868
UK MPs 1868–1874
UK MPs 1874–1880
UK MPs 1880–1885
Members of the Parliament of the United Kingdom for County Kerry constituencies (1801–1922)
19th-century Irish people
Irish chiefs of the name